101st Kilometer is a 2001 Russian drama film directed by Leonid Maryagin.

Plot 
The film takes place in the 50s in a city located at the 101st kilometre from Moscow, where criminals are sent, whose company includes a guy Leonid, whom the local leader offers to participate in robberies. And the militia, in turn, offer him to write denunciations.

Cast 
 Pyotr Fyodorov as Leonid
 Sergey Kaplunov as Zvonilkin
 Glafira Sotnikova as Rita
 Oleg Zhukov as Kostya
 Evgeniy Kosyrev

References

External links 
 

2001 films
2000s Russian-language films
Russian drama films
2001 drama films